Étienne Hubert (born 27 January 1988) is a French sprint canoeist.

Career
Hubert has competed since the late 2000s. He won a gold medal in the K-4 1000 m event at the 2010 ICF Canoe Sprint World Championships in Poznań.

External links

Étienne Hubert CARAVAN series ambassador profile
 

French male canoeists
ICF Canoe Sprint World Championships medalists in kayak
1988 births
Living people
Canoeists at the 2015 European Games
European Games competitors for France
Canoeists at the 2016 Summer Olympics
Canoeists at the 2020 Summer Olympics
Olympic canoeists of France
Canoeists at the 2019 European Games
People from Sedan, Ardennes
Sportspeople from Ardennes (department)
20th-century French people
21st-century French people